Bernard Monnereau (18 September 1935 – 24 August 2019) was a French rower.

Monnereau was born in Tôtes in 1935. He competed at the 1960 Summer Olympics in Rome in double sculls partnered with René Duhamel, where they came fourth. They won a gold medal at the inaugural 1962 World Rowing Championships in Lucerne in the double sculls. At the 1964 Summer Olympics in Tokyo, Monnereau and Duhamel came sixth in the double sculls.

References

1935 births
2019 deaths
French male rowers
World Rowing Championships medalists for France
Rowers at the 1960 Summer Olympics
Rowers at the 1964 Summer Olympics
Olympic rowers of France
European Rowing Championships medalists
Mediterranean Games gold medalists for France
Mediterranean Games medalists in rowing
Competitors at the 1963 Mediterranean Games